Susan Marshall may refer to:

Susan Marshall (musician), American singer and songwriter
Susan Marshall (choreographer) (born 1958), American choreographer
Susan H. Marshall, American mathematician
Susan Marshall McDonald (1918–1992), American philatelist and philatelic author